The 1986 Idaho Vandals football team represented the University of Idaho in the 1986 NCAA Division I-AA football season. The Vandals, led by first-year head coach Keith Gilbertson, were members of the Big Sky Conference and played their home games at the Kibbie Dome, an indoor facility on campus in Moscow, Idaho.

Led by senior quarterback Scott Linehan, Idaho qualified for the I-AA playoffs for the second straight season.

Notable games
The Vandals defeated rival Boise State for the fifth consecutive year, the fifth of twelve straight over the Broncos, but lost twice to Nevada, who were top-ranked in I-AA and undefeated in the regular season.

Division I-AA playoffs
The playoffs were expanded from 12 to 16 teams in 1986 NCAA Division I-AA football season, eliminating the first round bye for the top four seeds.  Idaho and Big Sky champion Nevada were the only two teams selected from the West, and were paired up in the first round in Reno two days after Thanksgiving.  In mid-October the teams played a close defensive game, and the Vandals came up short by four points. The rematch in the post-season was not close as the Wolf Pack prevailed 27–7, improving their record over Idaho to 8–1 since joining the Big Sky in 1979.

Notable players
The 1986 team included two future NFL head coaches: quarterback Scott Linehan and offensive lineman Tom Cable. Future NFL players with lengthy pro careers included guard Mark Schlereth (redshirt sophomore) and redshirt freshman John Friesz, a future collegiate hall of fame quarterback was Linehan's back-up in 1986.  Friesz was a three-year starter (1987–89) and defeated Nevada-Reno all three seasons, including the first-ever victory in Reno in 1988.

Schedule

Roster

All-conference
Linebacker Tom Hennessey was a repeat selection to the all-conference  Eight Vandals were included on the second team: safety Mark Tidd, linebacker Nolan Harper, defensive end Kord Smith, quarterback Scott Linehan, running back Steve Jackson, wide receiver Brant Bengen, and tackles Paul Taggert and Greg Hale.

References

External links
Gem of the Mountains: 1987 University of Idaho yearbook – 1986 football season
Idaho Argonaut – student newspaper – 1986  editions

Idaho Vandals
Idaho Vandals football seasons
Idaho Vandals